HMS Cornwall, pennant number 56, was a  heavy cruiser of the Kent sub-class built for the Royal Navy in the mid-1920s. The ship spent most of her pre-World War II career assigned to the China Station. Shortly after the war began in August 1939, she was assigned to search for German commerce raiders in the Indian Ocean. Cornwall was transferred to the South Atlantic in late 1939 where she escorted convoys before returning to the Indian Ocean in 1941. After the start of the Pacific War in December 1941, she began escorting convoys until she was transferred to the Eastern Fleet in March 1942. The ship was sunk on 5 April by dive bombers from three Japanese aircraft carriers during the Indian Ocean Raid.

Description
Steam for the turbines was provided by eight Admiralty 3-drum boilers. The ship's complement was 784 officers and men.

The ship mounted eight 50-calibre 8-inch (203 mm) guns in four twin gun turrets. Her secondary armament consisted of four QF  Mk V anti-aircraft (AA) guns in single mounts. Cornwall mounted four single 2-pounder (40 mm) light AA guns ("pom-poms"). The ship carried two quadruple torpedo tube above-water mounts for  torpedoes.

Cornwall was only lightly protected with little more than a single inch of plating protecting vital machinery. Space and weight was reserved for one aircraft catapult and its seaplane, but they were not fitted until after she was completed.

Construction and career
Cornwall, the fifth ship of her name to serve in the Royal Navy, was named after the eponymous county. The ship was laid down at Devonport Dockyard on 9 October 1924 and was launched on 11 March 1926. Completed on 6 December 1927, she was assigned to the 5th Cruiser Squadron (CS) on the China Station and spent the bulk of the interbellum period there. In 1929–30 she received a High-Angle Control System, used to direct her anti-aircraft guns, and a catapult was fitted the following year. Two quadruple Vickers .50-calibre (12.7 mm) Mark III machine guns were added in 1934.

In July 1936, Cornwall returned home to begin a major refit, which included a  Krupp cemented armour belt abreast the engine and boiler rooms as well as the dynamo room and the fire control transmitting station. This belt extended  down from the lower deck. Four inches of armour were also added to protect the sides of the boiler room fan compartments. A hangar for her aircraft was added and a new, more powerful catapult was installed. The ship's director was moved to the roof of the hangar and a new power-operated director-control tower was installed in its original location. Her single four-inch AA guns were replaced with twin-gun mounts for Mark XVI guns of the same calibre. Two octuple-barrel 2-pounder mounts were added abreast the searchlight tower and the original 2-pounder guns were removed. After the refit was completed in December 1937, the ship was assigned to the 2nd Cruiser Squadron before rejoining the 5th CS in 1939.

On 5 October 1939, a month after the start of World War II, she was assigned to Force I to hunt for German commerce raiders in the Indian Ocean and spent most of the rest of the year there. Cornwall was then transferred to the South Atlantic for convoy escort duties. On 13 September 1940, the ship rendezvoused with a convoy that was carrying troops intended to capture Dakar from the Vichy French, but was detached to intercept the Vichy French light cruiser  that was escorting an oil tanker to Libreville, French Equatorial Africa, five days later and forced them to return to Casablanca in French Morocco. She then returned to the Indian Ocean and sank the German commerce raider  on 8 May 1941. Cornwall rescued 3 officers, 57 ratings and 22 prisoners after the battle.

After the start of the Pacific War on 7 December, the ship began escorting convoys across the Indian Ocean, examples being Convoy JS.1 from Colombo, Ceylon, to the Dutch East Indies in late January–early February 1942 and the troop Convoy MS. 5 to Australia in early March. Later that month, she was assigned to the fast Force A of the Eastern Fleet. On 2 April, Cornwall and her half sister, were detached from the fleet, Dorsetshire to resume an interrupted refit and Cornwall to escort convoy SU-4 (composed of the U.S. Army transport  and Australian transport ) to Australia and the aircraft carrier  to Trincomalee in Ceylon for repairs. On 4 April, the Japanese fleet was spotted and the two cruisers left harbour and, after a hurried refuelling at sea, set out for Addu Atoll shortly after midnight. The following day, the two cruisers were sighted by a spotter plane from the  about 200 miles (370 km) south-west of Ceylon.

British losses were 424 men killed; 1,122 survivors spent thirty hours in the water before being rescued by the light cruiser  and two destroyers.

References

Bibliography

External links

 HMS Cornwall at U-boat.net
 IWM Interview with survivor Robert Crick
 IWM Interview with survivor John Maule
 IWM Interview with survivor Harold Farmer
 IWM Interview with survivor Roger Collett
 IWM Interview with survivor Patrick Fitz
 IWM Interview with survivor Edwin Drew
 IWM Interview with survivor Benjamin Fuller

 

Kent-class cruisers
County-class cruisers of the Royal Navy
Ships built in Plymouth, Devon
1926 ships
World War II cruisers of the United Kingdom
World War II shipwrecks in the Indian Ocean
Maritime incidents in April 1942
Cruisers sunk by aircraft
Ships sunk by Japanese aircraft